is a Japanese mixed martial artist. A professional since 2013, he currently competes in the Welterweight division in the Ultimate Fighting Championship (UFC).

Early life 
Born to a Japanese father and Taiwanese mother, Sato grew up in Shinjuku, Tokyo, with his parents and older brother. He was a big fan of reading comics just like many other Japanese children. However one day, his older brother accidentally threw them all out. Sato says he cried the whole day until the following day his father felt very bad and came home from work with a new comic based on a kid becoming a judo champion. This then inspired Sato to pursue Judo and he used to train at the local police station.

Mixed martial arts career

Japan 
Sato started his MMA career fighting in various promotions in Japan. Sato then fought for Pancrase and Deep promotions in Japan. He earned a Pancrase title shot but lost to Glaico França. Sato earned the opportunity to fight in the UFC after beating former UFC fighter Matt Vaile.

Ultimate Fighter Championship
Sato signed with the UFC on April 2, 2019 and made his UFC debut on April 27, 2019 against Ben Saunders at UFC Fight Night: Jacaré vs. Hermansson.  After being tagged by Saunders early, Sato won the fight by knockout.

Sato's next Fight was against Belal Muhammad on September 7, 2019 in the United Emirates at UFC 242.  Sato lost by rear-naked choke in the third round.

Sato was scheduled to face Maki Pitolo at UFC Fight Night 168 on February 23, 2020. However, Pitolo was unable to make weight and the bout was scrapped from the card.

Sato was scheduled to face Ramiz Brahimaj on June 27, 2020  at UFC on ESPN: Poirier vs. Hooker  but the fight was scratched due to one of Brahimaj's cornermen testing positive for COVID-19. Two days before the fight, Sato's opponent was switched to UFC newcomer Jason Witt. Sato won the fight via knock out in 48 seconds in round one.

Sato was scheduled to face Daniel Rodriguez on August 22, 2020 at UFC on ESPN 15. However, despite making the required weight, Sato was not cleared to fight by Nevada State Athletic Commission medical personnel and was removed from the card. Later, Sato revealed that a skin infection in his torso was the reason for the removal.

As the last fight of his contract, Sato faced Miguel Baeza on November 28, 2020 at UFC on ESPN: Smith vs. Clark. He lost the fight via second round arm-triangle choke.

Sato returned after more than a one year hiatus and faced Gunnar Nelson, replacing injured Cláudio Silva,  on 19 March 2022 at UFC Fight Night 204. He lost the fight via unanimous decision.

Sato faced Bryan Battle on August 6, 2022 at UFC on ESPN: Santos vs. Hill. He lost the fight via knockout in round one.

Mixed martial arts record 
 

|-
|Loss
|align=center|15–6
|Bryan Battle
|KO (head kick)
|UFC on ESPN: Santos vs. Hill
|
|align=center|1
|align=center|0:44
|Las Vegas, Nevada, United States
|
|-
|Loss
|align=center|15–5
|Gunnar Nelson
|Decision (unanimous) 
|UFC Fight Night: Volkov vs. Aspinall
|
|align=center|3
|align=center|5:00
|London, England
|
|-
|Loss
|align=center|15–4
|Miguel Baeza
|Submission (arm-triangle choke)
|UFC on ESPN: Smith vs. Clark
|
|align=center|2
|align=center|4:28
|Las Vegas, Nevada, United States
|
|-
|Win
|align=center|15–3
|Jason Witt
|TKO (punches)
|UFC on ESPN: Poirier vs. Hooker
|
|align=center|1
|align=center|0:48
|Las Vegas, Nevada, United States
|
|-
|Loss
|align=center|14–3
|Belal Muhammad
|Submission (rear-naked choke)
|UFC 242
|
|align=center|3
|align=center|1:55
|Abu Dhabi, United Arab Emirates
|
|-
|Win
|align=center|14–2
|Ben Saunders
|TKO (punches and elbows)
|UFC Fight Night: Jacaré vs. Hermansson
|
|align=center|2
|align=center|1:18
|Sunrise, Florida, United States
|
|-
|Win
|align=center|13–2
|Matt Vaile
|TKO (punches)
|Pancrase 300
|
|align=center|2
|align=center|3:35
|Tokyo, Japan
|
|-
|Loss
|align=center|12–2
|Glaico França
|Submission (rear-naked choke)
|Pancrase 297
|
|align=center|4
|align=center|1:15
|Tokyo, Japan
|
|-
|Win
|align=center|12–1
|Masayuki Hamagishi
|TKO (elbows and punches)
|GRANDSLAM 7
|
|align=center|2
|align=center|3:59
|Tokyo, Japan
|
|-
|Win
|align=center|11–1
|Akihiro Murayama
|TKO (punches) 
|Pancrase 292
|
|align=center|1
|align=center|0:52
|Tokyo, Japan
|
|-
|Win
|align=center|10–1
|Kenta Takagi 
|TKO (punches)
|Pancrase 289
|
|align=center|1
|align=center|4:15
|Tokyo, Japan
|
|-
|Win
|align=center|9–1
|Anton Radman 
|TKO (knee)
|Pancrase 286
|
|align=center|1
|align=center|3:43
|Tokyo, Japan
|
|-
|Win
|align=center|8–1
|Eric Michael Fought
|Decision (split)
|Pancrase 273
|
|align=center|3
|align=center|3:00
|Tokyo, Japan
|
|-
|Loss
|align=center|7–1
|Kenta Takagi
|TKO (punch)
|Pancrase 269
|
|align=center|1
|align=center|2:27
|Tokyo, Japan
|
|-
|Win
|align=center|7–0
|Yusaku Tsukumo
|TKO (doctor stoppage)
|DEEP 72 Impact 
|
|align=center|1
|align=center|2:09
|Tokyo, Japan
|
|-
|Win
|align=center|6–0
|Vyron Phillips
|Decision (unanimous)
|Pancrase 265
|
|align=center|3
|align=center|5:00
|Tokyo, Japan
|
|-
|Win
|align=center|5–0
|Hidetora
|TKO (punches)
|DEEP DREAM Impact 
|
|align=center|1
|align=center|4:21
|Saitama, Japan
|
|-
|Win
|align=center|4–0
|Yasuaki Miura 
|TKO (punch)
|TTF Challenge 03
|
|align=center|1
|align=center|0:29
|Tokyo, Japan
|
|-
|Win
|align=center|3–0
|Genpei Hayashi 
|TKO (punches)
|Pancrase 260 
|
|align=center|1
|align=center|2:51
|Tokyo, Japan
|
|-
|Win
|align=center|2–0
|Makoto Kawawa
|Submission (rear-naked choke)
|Pancrase 258
|
|align=center|3
|align=center|2:36
|Tokyo, Japan
|
|-
|Win
|align=center|1–0
|Joe Proctor 
|Submission (arm-triangle choke)
|Pancrase Bayside Fight 2 
|
|align=center|1
|align=center|2:31
|Yokohama, Japan
|
|-

See also 
 List of current UFC fighters
 List of male mixed martial artists

External links

References

Living people
1990 births
Ultimate Fighting Championship male fighters
Welterweight mixed martial artists
Japanese male mixed martial artists
Mixed martial artists utilizing judo
Japanese male judoka
Japanese people of Taiwanese descent
Senshu University alumni
Sportspeople from Tokyo
20th-century Japanese people
21st-century Japanese people